This is a list of plantation great houses in Jamaica.

Great houses, or plantation houses, were built at a time when sugar cane made Jamaica the wealthiest English colony in the West Indies. Sugar cane was harvested by enslaved peoples.

British contemporary architecture was adapted to the tropics with features such as wide wrap-around verandas, jalousies, and sash windows to accommodate the Caribbean climate.

 Albion, Saint Thomas.
 Edinburgh Castle
 Halse Hall
 Good Hope, Trelawny
 Greenwood, St James
 Green Park
 Potosi
 Roaring River
 Rose Hall, Montego Bay.
 Roxbro Castle
 Temple Hall
 Seville Great House, St. Ann, Jamaica

See also
 List of plantations in Jamaica

References

Great Houses in Jamaica
Plantation Great Houses in Jamaica